Jinny is a feminine given name which may refer to:

 Jinny Beyer (born 1941), American quilt designer and quilter
 Jinny Jacinto (born 1976), Canadian contortionist
 Jinny or Jinny Lee, a stage name of South Korean pop singer Chae Yeon (born 1978)
 Jinny Ng (born 1992), Hong Kong Cantopop singer, hostess and actress
 Jinny Osborn (1927–2003), American pop singer and co-founder of the Chordettes, born Virginia Cole
 Jinny (wrestler) (Jinny Sandhú), English professional wrestler
 Jinny Sims (born 1952), Indian-born Canadian politician

See also
 Ginny, a list of people named Ginny or Ginnie
 Jinni (disambiguation)
 Jinnie Trail, a conservation area in Staffordshire, England
 Tutbury Jinnie, a local rail service between the stations at Burton-on-Trent and Tutbury, Staffordshire
 Jinni, plural of jinn, a supernatural creature in Arabian and Islamic mythology

Feminine given names